The 2014 Austin Peay Governors football team represented Austin Peay State University during the 2014 NCAA Division I FCS football season. The Governors were led by second-year head coach Kirby Cannon, played their home games at Governors Stadium, and were a member of the Ohio Valley Conference. They finished the season 1–11, 1–7 in OVC play to finish in a tie for eighth place.

Schedule

Source: ScheduleAPSUTV airs across the state on Charter Channel 99, CDE Lightband Channel 9, and U-Verse 99. It is also the broadcast OVC Digital Network uses for its free stream.

References

Austin Peay
Austin Peay Governors football seasons
Austin Peay Governors football